The Sri Lanka Girl Guides Association (SLGGA, Lanka Baladhakshika Samajaya) (Sinhala:ශ්රී ලංකා බාළදක්ෂිකා සංගමය) is the national Guiding organization of Sri Lanka. It serves 54,824 members (as of 2016). Founded in 1917, the girls-only organization became a full member of the World Association of Girl Guides and Girl Scouts in 1951.

History 
Girl Guiding was first introduced to Sri Lanka by Ms. G.S.Green, for young girls of Girls' High School Kandy. The Guiding company was then named as 'Rosa Kekulu' meaning, 'rose buds'. In 1918, Sri Lankan Girl Guide Association joined hands  with the London Association.

Program and ideals 
In the 1960s the image of Girl Guiding in Sri Lanka was changed to give it a local character. New Sri Lanka badges for all ranks in the three branches were introduced.

SLGGA is divided into four sections: 
Butterflies; aged 5– 8
"Kuda Mithuriye" (Little Friend); aged 7–12 
"Baladhakshika" (Guide); aged 12–17 
"Jyeshta Baladhakshika" (Rangers); aged 15–22

Girl Guide Motto 
Be prepared

Symbols of the movement

The left-handshake 
The Founder of the World Girl Guides Association suggested a Left Handshake to recognise other members of the Movement, and it is still used widely. When asked to explain the origin, Lord Baden-Powell related a legend told to him in West Africa: two hostile, neighboring communities decided to try to live together in peace, and so they flung down their shields, which were carried on the left arm, and advanced, unprotected, to greet each other with their left hands extended in trust and friendship. This was adapted in Sri Lankan Girl Guide movement.

The salute 
To make the sign, raise the three middle fingers of the right hand, with the thumb holding the little finger down. The three fingers represent the three parts of the Girl Guide and Girl Scout promise and echo the core values of integrity, citizenship and spirituality. The hand is raised and held at the forehead as in a salute. This is practiced worldwide by girl guides.

Sri Lanka Girl Guide flag 
To give a local face to the Association, in the decade of 1960s, three new Badges for the three ranks of the three branches were introduced. With the Sri Lankan Girl Guide Association's logo (an elephant in the centre of the 'Thripatha') in the center with dark blue background, the flag was designed. It is designed that when hoisted, the elephant is facing the flag pole. It was introduced in 1968.

Girl Guide Promise 

I promise on my honor to do my best:
To do my duty, to my Religion and Country,
To help other people at all times, and
To live by the Guide Law.

Girl Guide Law 
A Guide is honest, reliable and can be trusted.
A Guide is loyal.
A Guide is considerate and helpful at all times.
A Guide is a sister to every other Guide.
A Guide is friendly and courteous.
A Guide is compassionate to all living things.
A Guide respects authority.
A Guide is courageous and faces all situations with understanding.
A Guide uses resources wisely.
A Guide respects herself and seeks to understand all human beings.

Overseas branches
An overseas branch of the Sri Lanka Girl Guides Association operates at the Sri Lankan School in Muscat, Oman.

In 2009, Girl Guides at the Sri Lankan School in Muscat had their camp in October canceled to prevent the spread of Swine flu. The Guides paper recycling project was also discontinued for the same reason.

See also
Sri Lanka Scout Association

References

World Association of Girl Guides and Girl Scouts member organizations
Youth organisations based in Sri Lanka
Scouting and Guiding in Sri Lanka
Youth organizations established in 1917